State Highway 17 (SH 17) is an  state highway in southern Colorado, United States. SH 17's southern terminus is a continuation as New Mexico State Road 17 (NM 17) at the New Mexico state line, and the northern terminus is at U.S. Route 285 (US 285) south of Villa Grove.

Route description

SH 17 is officially split into two parts by a stretch of concurrence with US 285. The first part of the route begins in the south at the New Mexico state line where the road becomes New Mexico State Road 17. Along this section, the road offers access to Rio Grande National Forest and the many recreational activities it offers.

After leaving the national forest, the road continues east for approximately 13 more miles before merging with US 285 at Antonito. From Antonito, SH 17 runs northward concurrent with US 285 for just over thirty miles to the city of Alamosa. At Alamosa, the second part of SH 17 begins after the road splits from US 285. From there, the road proceeds northward up the middle of the San Luis Valley between the Sangre de Christo Mountains in the east and the San Juan Mountains to the west. The route passes through the towns of Mosca, Hooper (where the road meets the eastern end of SH 112) and Moffat before reaching its northern terminus where it again meets US 285 roughly five miles south of Villa Grove.

History

When the route was established in the 1920s, the route was broken into two sections. The road began at Pagosa Springs and began southeast and disappeared as the route ended at the New Mexico state line. The route then reappeared northeast and terminated at SH 15 (now moved) near Mineral Hot Springs.  Within the northeast segment, the route from Antonito to Alamosa was paved by 1936. The portion of the eastern segment from the New Mexico state line to Antonito was deleted and readded by 1938 and 1946, respectively. The rest of the route, not included the segment from New Mexico to Antonito, was paved by 1954. In 1968, the sections of the highway that were concurrent with other highways were eliminated, leaving the two segments existent now. The route was paved by 1970.

Major intersections

See also

 List of state highways in Colorado

Notes

References

External links

017
Transportation in Archuleta County, Colorado
Transportation in Conejos County, Colorado
Transportation in Alamosa County, Colorado
Transportation in Saguache County, Colorado